Time Warp Trio is an animated television series based on the children's book series of the same name. Created by Jon Scieszka, the series was produced by WGBH Boston in association with Soup2Nuts. The series aired from July 9, 2005 to July 15, 2006 on Discovery Kids.

Plot
For his tenth birthday, Joe receives a mysterious blue book (known only as "The Book") from his magician uncle, Joe the Magnificent. By reading the book, Joe and his friends, Sam and Fred, are - often accidentally - transported to various times and places throughout history, such as Ancient Egypt and the Old West. In the year 2105, the trio meets their own great-granddaughters, Jodie, Samantha, and Freddi.

After each time warp, the group must find and use The Book in order to return to the present day. Later in the series, Joe's evil uncle, Mad Jack, makes several attempts to capture the children and The Book with crafty tricks, such as stranding them in Antarctica (since The Book does not work there).

Characters

Main characters 
 Joseph "Joe" Arthur (voiced by Mark Rendall) – An up-and-coming magician and the present-day owner of The Book. He descends from the Gupta Empire in India.  His penchant for experimenting with The Book results in many of their adventures, and his talent for magical tricks helps them out of tough situations. At one point, Joe is awarded the title of Time Page, and he is said to eventually become a Warp Wizard. According to Freddi and Jodie, Joe will fight his uncle, Mad Jack, in a great battle that will determine the fate of time itself. He lives in Brooklyn with his archeologist father, his mother, and little sister Anna.
 Samuel "Sam" Kikin (voiced by Darren Frost) – A friend of Joe and Fred who solves problems using intelligence and historical knowledge. He is of Russian descent. Depicted as being a stereotypical nerd, he wears glasses and has multiple allergies. Sam is wary of time travel, being convinced of their imminent doom every time they open The Book. An amateur scientist and inventor, he is told by Freddi that he will invent something very important in the future.
 Frederick "Fred" McGrew  (voiced by Scott McCord) – A friend of Joe and Sam who wears a baseball cap and is a sports fan and known for being fun-loving, teasing, and headstrong, often to the point of idiocy. Fred is the most interested in using The Book for material gains, whether hunting for treasure or patenting future technology - yet in "Dude, Where's My Karma?", he uses it to save Joe from being erased from existence.
 Jodie Arthur (voiced by Sarah Gadon until ep. 14; voiced by Tajja Isen starting with ep. 20) – Joe's great-granddaughter from the year 2105.  She is an aspiring fashion designer who is known for being bossy, rude, condescending, and complaining a lot. Jodie is referred to as a "third-level warper" and demonstrates great mastery over The Book. She also dislikes cats as she is allergic to them.
 Samantha Kikin (voiced by Laurie Elliott) – Sam's great-granddaughter from the year 2105. She, like Fred, is known for being teasing, funny, impulsive, and headstrong – the exact opposite of Sam (though like Sam, she can be sensitive at times). Samantha has a pet robot cat named Rivites and owns a time-traveling pocket watch that Sam had invented a long time ago.
 Frederica "Freddi" McGrew (voiced by Sunday Muse) – Fred's great-granddaughter from the year 2105. She is very friendly and sweet-natured, but she is also shy, malleable, sensitive, and seems to be the exact opposite of Fred (though like Fred, she can be brave if the situation suits her).

Recurring characters 
 Anna Arthur (voiced by Annick Obonsawin) – Joe's annoying younger sister, who seems to have greater knowledge of The Book than her brother.
 Joe the Magnificent (voiced by Tony Daniels) – Joe's uncle and namesake, a would-be magician who fails at live performances. He sent his nephew Joe The Book, which he didn't know how to use, and instead traverses time and space with an enchanted pocket watch. He believes in the Tooth Fairy and Easter Bunny.
 Mad Jack (voiced by Tony Daniels) – Mad Jack is the evil brother of Joe the Magnificent and Lila Arthur. He is intent on stealing The Book so that he can be the sole ruler of eternity. He shadows the trio in many of their travels, once facing down with his nephew Joe. Mad Jack travels through time and space using a scepter with an hourglass on top.
 Lila Arthur (voiced by Susan Roman) – Joe and Anna's mother. She knows how to use The Book, being the one to originally give it to her brother.
 Ronald Arthur (voiced by Tom Arnold) – Joe and Anna's father. He is a world-famous archeologist
Mike McGrew (voiced by Dan Petronijevic) – Fred's mean older brother who appears in "See You Later, Gladiator" and "Viking It and Liking It".

Historical characters
 Blackbeard (voiced by Cal Dodd)
 Israel Hands (voiced by Bill Colgate)
 Genghis Khan (child, voiced by Daniel DeSanto)
 Thutmose III
 Tokugawa Ieyasu (voiced by Denis Akiyama)
 Emperor Hadrian
 Meriwether Lewis (voiced by Ted Atherton)
 William Clark (voiced by Don Dickinson)
 Sacagawea (voiced by Stephanie Morgenstern)
 Eric the Red (voiced by Tony Daniels)
 Leif Ericson (voiced by Robert Norman Smith)
 Thomas Edison (voiced by Michael Therriault)
 Emily Roebling
 Black Kettle
 Napoleon Bonaparte (voiced by Paul Essiembre)
 Sophie Blanchard (voiced by Stephanie Martin)
 King Nebuchadnezzar II (voiced by Juan Chioran)
 Queen Amyitis
 Queen Jinga (voiced by Alison Sealy Smith)
 Plato
 Li Shimin
 Peter the Great
 Alexander Kikin
 Mary Shelley (voiced by Vickie Papavs)
 Lord Byron
 Leonardo da Vinci
 Robert Falcon Scott (voiced by Michael Fletcher)
 Amelia Earhart
 Selim II
 William Montagu
 Agnes Randolph (voiced by Corrine Koslo)

Episodes

Broadcast
Time Warp Trio aired on Discovery Kids and premiered in the United States on July 9, 2005. The final episode aired on July 15, 2006. After the series ended, reruns aired on The Hub until June 26, 2012.

It also aired on TVOKids in Canada, CBBC in the United Kingdom and Ireland, Cartoon Network in Australia and New Zealand, and HBO Family & Cartoon Network in Southeast Asia. It also aired as part of a three-hour Discovery Kids block on NBC until September 2, 2006, and on Jetix (later Disney XD) in India. It also airs on PBS Kids in Africa. It was also dubbed into Hebrew under the title "מלכודת הזמן" and aired on Logi and Arutz HaYeladim, the series was also aired in South Korea on EBS under the name "시간 여행 삼총사" with Korean subtitles. It also aired in Portugal on RTP2 (formerly 2:), where it was dubbed into Portuguese under the title "Trio no Tempo", it also aired in Italy on DeA Kids.

In other media

Comics
 Nightmare on Joe's Street
 The Seven Blunders of the World
 Plaid to the Bone
 Meet you at Waterloo ("Able Was I, Ere I Saw Elba")

Chapter books
 You Can't, But Genghis Khan
 Lewis and Clark...and Jodie, Freddi, and Samantha
 Wushu Were Here

References

External links
 

2000s American animated television series
2000s Canadian animated television series
2000s American time travel television series
2000s Canadian time travel television series
2005 American television series debuts
2005 Canadian television series debuts
2006 American television series endings
2006 Canadian television series endings
American children's animated action television series
American children's animated adventure television series
American children's animated comic science fiction television series
American children's animated education television series
American flash animated television series
American television shows based on children's books
Canadian children's animated action television series
Canadian children's animated adventure television series
Canadian children's animated comic science fiction television series
Canadian children's animated education television series
Canadian flash animated television series
Canadian television shows based on children's books
American time travel television series
Canadian time travel television series
Animated television series about children
Discovery Kids original programming
TVO original programming
English-language television shows
Historical television series
Television series by Soup2Nuts
Television series by WGBH
Television shows set in New York City
Fictional trios